The 2013–14 Texas A&M–Corpus Christi Islanders men's basketball team represented Texas A&M University–Corpus Christi in the 2013–14 NCAA Division I men's basketball season. This was head coach Willis Wilson's third season at Texas A&M–Corpus Christi. The Islanders were members of the Southland Conference and played their home games at the American Bank Center and the Dugan Wellness Center. They finished the season 18–16, 14–4 in Southland play to finish in second place. They lost in the semifinals of the Southland Conference tournament to Sam Houston State. They were invited to the CollegeInsider.com Tournament where they defeated Northern Colorado in the first round before losing in the second round to Pacific.

Media
Texas A&M–Corpus Christi men's basketball airs on KKTX with Steven King on the call all season long. Video streaming of all non-televised home games is available at GoIslanders.com.

Roster

Schedule and results

|-
!colspan=9 style="background:#0067C5; color:#9EA2A4;"| Exhibition

|-
!colspan=9 style="background:#0067C5; color:#9EA2A4;"| Regular season

|-
!colspan=9 style="background:#0067C5; color:#9EA2A4;"| Southland tournament

|-
!colspan=9 style="background:#0067C5; color:#9EA2A4;"| CIT

References

Texas A&M–Corpus Christi Islanders men's basketball seasons
Texas AandM-Corpus Christi
Texas AandM-Corpus Christi
Texas AandM-Corpus Christi Islanders basketball
Texas AandM-Corpus Christi Islanders basketball